Fairy was a small wooden sidewheel-driven steamship placed into service on Puget Sound in 1853.  Fairy was the first steam-powered vessel to conduct regularly scheduled service on Puget Sound.

Career
Fairy was built in San Francisco and brought to Puget Sound in November 1853 on the deck of the sailing ship Sarah Warren.  The vessel was placed on the Olympia to Seattle run.

References
 Findlay, Jean Cammon and Paterson, Robin, Mosquito Fleet of Southern Puget Sound, (2008) Arcadia Publishing 

Steamboats of Washington (state)
Sidewheel steamboats of Washington (state)
Passenger ships of the United States
1853 ships